Bugant  is an urban-type settlement in the Yeröö sum (district) of Selenge Province in northern Mongolia. It is 66 km SE from Yeröö sum center  and 112 km NE from Züünkharaa city.

Bugant was built in the socialist period as a gold mining center.

Populated places in Mongolia